The seal of Northampton County, Virginia, was developed to reflect the county's history, its traditional way of life and its ties to the marine environment.

The gold rope which borders the seal represents the county's bond to the sea and its geographic location between the Atlantic Ocean and the Chesapeake Bay. The four panels represent the county's economy (in agriculture and fisheries), life-style (coastal) and the community's relationship with the environment (depicted by the crabs, fish and geese).

The three dates in the inner circle represent:
The first recorded English landing in 1603 by Bartholomew Gilbert.
The first permanent English settlement in 1620.
Recognition as an original shire of the colony governed by England in 1634.

The black stems separating the gold band signify the points of the compass and the county's nautical history. The blue field surrounding the map represents clear skies and calm seas. The gold band depicts the county as a "unique area; precious and rare." Northampton County, shown in white, represents sunlight and a desire to do well.

Northampton County, Virginia
Northampton